Walnut–Chancellor Historic District is a national historic district located in the Rittenhouse Square West neighborhood of Philadelphia, Pennsylvania. It encompasses 51 contributing buildings located one block east of Rittenhouse Square.  It includes 4 1/2- to 5-story monumental residences in the Italianate style; brick rowhouses dated to the 1860s-1870s, some with mansard roofs and dormers; and 19th century carriage houses.  Located in the district is the Thomas Hockley House (1875), designed by architect Frank Furness (1839-1912).

It was added to the National Register of Historic Places in 1980.

Gallery

References

Historic districts in Philadelphia
Buildings and structures on the National Register of Historic Places in Philadelphia
Rittenhouse Square, Philadelphia
Historic districts on the National Register of Historic Places in Pennsylvania